Punk in Africa, is a 2012 multilingual African documentary historical punk music film co-directed by Deon Maas and Keith Jones and co-produced by director himself with Jefe Brown. The film stars Ivan Kadey, Paulo Chibanga, Lee Thomson, and Warwick Sony. The film revolves around the story of the multiracial punk movement within the political and social upheavals experienced in three Southern African countries: South Africa, Mozambique and Zimbabwe.

The film made its premier on 29 January 2012 in the United States. The film received mixed reviews from critics and screened at many film festivals. The film music done by multiple musical bands across Southern Africa such as: Suck, Wild Youth, Safari Suits, Power Age, National Wake, KOOS, Kalahari Surfers, The Genuines, Hog Hoggidy Hog, Fuzigish, Sibling Rivalry, 340ml (Mozambique), Panzer, The Rudimentals (Zimbabwe ), Evicted, Sticky Antlers, Freak, LYT, Jagwa Music, Fruits and Veggies, Swivel Foot.

In 2013, the DVD of the film was released as an international version without a regional code and with English, German, Spanish and Portuguese subtitles for the English-language audio version.

Cast
 Paulo Chibanga		
 Michael Fleck		
 Ivan Kadey		
 Ruben Rose		
 Warrick Sony		
 Lee Thomson

References

External links 
 

South African documentary films
2012 films
South African musical films